The  is an inactive professional wrestling championship in the Japanese promotion , a sub-brand of DDT Pro-Wrestling. IMGP is the acronym of International Muscle Grand Prix and a parody of New Japan Pro-Wrestling's governing body, the International Wrestling Grand Prix.

The championship was introduced in late 2006 and has been represented by a belt resembling the second IWGP Heavyweight Championship design. Since Atsushi Maruyama won the title in 2015, it has never been defended nor has it been officially deactivated.

Title history

Combined reigns

Footnotes

See also

DDT Pro-Wrestling
Professional wrestling in Japan

References

DDT Pro-Wrestling championships
World heavyweight wrestling championships